The 2015 Family Circle Cup was a women's tennis event on the 2015 WTA Tour. It took place between April 6–12, 2015. It was the 43rd edition of the tournament and a Premier level tournament. The event was hosted at the Family Circle Tennis Center, on Daniel Island, Charleston, United States. It was the only event of the clay court season played on green clay.

Points and prize money

Point distribution

Prize money

Singles main draw entrants

Seeds 

1 Rankings as of 23 March 2015.

Other entrants 
The following players received wildcards into the main draw:
  Eugenie Bouchard
  Varvara Lepchenko 
  Bethanie Mattek-Sands
  Sachia Vickery

The following player received entry using a protected ranking into the main draw:
  Edina Gallovits-Hall

The following players received entry from the qualifying draw:
  Kateryna Bondarenko
  Lucie Hradecká
  Sesil Karatancheva
  Danka Kovinić
  Kristína Kučová
  Jessica Pegula
  Laura Siegemund
  Sara Sorribes Tormo

Withdrawals 
Before the tournament
  Jarmila Gajdošová →replaced by  Stefanie Vögele
  Sabine Lisicki →replaced by  Andreea Mitu
  Peng Shuai →replaced by  Grace Min
  Lucie Šafářová  →replaced by  Çağla Büyükakçay
  Lesia Tsurenko →replaced by  Evgeniya Rodina
  Taylor Townsend →replaced by  Tatjana Maria
  Barbora Záhlavová-Strýcová  →replaced by  Edina Gallovits-Hall
  Zheng Saisai →replaced by  Irina Falconi
During the tournament
  Jelena Janković (right foot injury)
  Ekaterina Makarova (gastrointestinal illness)

Retirements 
  Mona Barthel (dizziness)
  Varvara Lepchenko (lower back injury)
  Anastasia Pavlyuchenkova (left shoulder injury)

Doubles main draw entrants

Seeds 

1 Rankings as of March 23, 2015.

Other entrants 
The following pairs received wildcards into the doubles main draw:
  Madison Keys /  Lisa Raymond
  Alison Riske /  Shelby Rogers

Champions

Singles 

  Angelique Kerber defeated  Madison Keys, 6–2, 4–6, 7–5

Doubles 

  Martina Hingis /  Sania Mirza defeated  Casey Dellacqua /  Darija Jurak, 6–0, 6–4

References

External links 
 

2015 WTA Tour
Family Circle Cup
Family Circle Cup
Family Circle Cup
Charleston Open